Antonio Hidalgo is the name of:

Antonio Hidalgo (defender, born 1943), Spanish footballer
Antonio Hidalgo (forward, born 1943), Spanish footballer
Antonio Hidalgo (footballer, born 1979), Spanish footballer
Antonio Hidalgo López, Spanish government minister
Antonio Masip Hidalgo (born 1946), Spanish politician and Member of the European Parliament